Franz von Bayros (28 May 1866 – 3 April 1924) was an Austrian commercial artist, illustrator, and painter, best known for his controversial Tales at the Dressing Table portfolio.  He belonged to the Decadent movement in art, often utilizing erotic themes and phantasmagoric imagery.

Early years 
Bayros was born in Zagreb, which was part of the Austro-Hungarian Empire and is, today, Croatia.  At the age of seventeen, he passed the entrance examination for the Vienna Academy with Eduard von Engerth.  Bayros mixed in high society and was part of the circle of friends of Johann Strauss II, whose stepdaughter Alice he married in 1896. The next year, Bayros moved to Munich.

Career 
In 1904, he gave his first exhibition in Munich, which was well received. From 1904 until 1908, he traveled to Paris and Italy to further his studies. In 1911, he created his most famous and controversial work, Tales from the Dressing Table for which he was later arrested and exiled from Germany. Returning to Vienna, he felt like an outsider and the outbreak of the First World War increased his sense of alienation. His work can be found at the Metropolitan Museum of Art in New York. He drew over 2000 illustrations in total.

Death 
The artist died in Vienna in 1924, from a cerebral hemorrhage.

See also 
 List of Austrian artists and architects

References

External links 
 
 The Decadence of the Marquis von Bayros
 Dark Art: Bayros gallery
 Franz von Bayros Gallery and Biography

1866 births
1924 deaths
Academy of Fine Arts Vienna alumni
Austrian illustrators
Austrian nobility
Austrian erotic artists
Fetish artists
Modern artists
Artists from Zagreb
Zoophilia in culture